Waleed Al-Harbi (born February 1, 1986) is a Saudi football player who plays as a right-back.

References

1986 births
Living people
Saudi Arabian footballers
Al-Jewaa FC players
Al-Taawoun FC players
Al-Najma SC players
Al-Hazem F.C. players
Place of birth missing (living people)
Al-Bukayriyah FC players
Saudi Fourth Division players
Saudi First Division League players
Saudi Professional League players
Saudi Second Division players
Association football defenders